Papuadessus pakdjoko is a species of beetle in the family Dytiscidae, the only species in the genus Papuadessus.

References

Dytiscidae